Ryan Kinasewich (born August 20, 1983) is a Croatian-Canadian former professional ice hockey forward who played most notably in the American Hockey League (AHL), the ECHL, and the Austrian Erste Bank Eishockey Liga (EBEL). , he is the head coach the Utah Grizzlies in the ECHL.

Career
Kinasewich was originally selected in the third round, 37th overall, in the 1998 WHL Bantam Draft joining first overall draft pick, Jay Bouwmeester at the Medicine Hat Tigers. After two full seasons with the Tigers, Ryan then joined the Tri-City Americans from the 2001–02 season and contributed 39 goals with the Americans in the following year.

As an undrafted free agent, after completing his junior career, Kinasewich made his professional debut in the 2004–05 season, signing with the Reading Royals of the ECHL. After earning player of the week in the ECHL at the turn of the year, Ryan played in the ECHL All-Star game and later made his debut in the American Hockey League, signing a professional try-out agreement with the Manchester Monarchs, affiliate of the Los Angeles Kings.

Starting the 2005–06 season on the sidelines with injury, Kinasewich was later traded by the Royals to fellow ECHL team, the Utah Grizzlies. In addition to leading the Grizzlies with 85 points in 60 games, Ryan also co-led the ECHL in goals with 39. He stayed in the ECHL the following year, initially signing back with the Royals before he was returned to Utah in a trade prior to the 2006–07 season. He again led the Grizzlies in scoring with 29 goals and 59 points despite sustaining a season-ending injury on February 14, 2007, against the Fresno Falcons.

During the 2007–08 season, Kinasewich was signed by the Bridgeport Sound Tigers, the AHL affiliate of the Grizzlies' NHL affiliate, the New York Islanders, on a try-out. In 24 games, Kinasewich posted five points before returning to co-lead the Grizzlies with 60 points, including scoring a Grizzlies record of six points in a game (1 goal and 5 assists) in a 6–5 victory against the Phoenix RoadRunners on January 16, 2008. In 2008–09, Kinasewich remained in the ECHL with the Grizzlies with stints in the AHL with the Lake Erie Monsters and the Hamilton Bulldogs before recovering from a supposed season-ending injury suffered in February to re-join the Grizzlies in the playoffs.

On September 8, 2009, he re-signed to a one-year contract to captain the Grizzlies for the 2009–10 season. On October 24, 2009, Kinaeswich scored two goals in a 5–3 defeat to the Idaho Steelheads to tie and surpass Chris Taylor as the Grizzlies' all-time goal scoring leader. Two weeks later, Kinasewich posted a five-point night (3 goals and 2 assists) in an 8–3 rout of the Las Vegas Wranglers, to again surpass Taylor's 278 points as the franchise scoring leader on November 14. After 27 points in 12 games, he was signed to an AHL try-out contract with the Bulldogs on November 16, 2009. After five scoreless games in the AHL with the Bulldogs, and a four-point contribution in a brief return to the Sound Tigers, he primarily remained with Utah. He tied Kip Miller for most goals in a Grizzlies season, leading the ECHL with 48 goals and scoring 103 points in just 59 games. Named as a starter to the ECHL All-Star Game and selected to the ECHL first All-Star Team, Kinaeswich was also named as the only runner-up as the ECHL MVP. After five years, Kinasewich finished his prolific scoring tenure with the Grizzlies as the franchise record holder in goals (156), assists (200) and points (356).

Unable to establish himself above the ECHL level, on July 4, 2010, Kinasewich of Croatian descent left North America and signed a one-year contract as a free agent with Croatian team, KHL Medveščak Zagreb, of the Erste Bank Eishockey Liga (EBEL). After leading Zagreb for a second consecutive year in scoring with 54 points in 49 games, Kinasewich signed with fellow EBEL team, EC Red Bull Salzburg, on May 11, 2012.

Kinasewich's stay with Red Bull in the 2012–13 season was short lived as he was mutually released from his contract after 14 games. On October 31, 2012, he signed for the remainder of the season in Italy with Milano Rossoblu.

Upon the conclusion of his tenure with Milan, Kinasewich opted to return to the EBEL for the following season, signing an optional two-year contract with Graz 99ers on April 25, 2013.

After finishing his professional career, Kinasewich played in the Chinook Hockey League with the Lacombe Generals for the 2016–17 season. He ended his playing career and accepted an assistant coaching role with former club, the Utah Grizzlies of the ECHL, for the 2017–18 season. In 2021, he was named the head coach of the Grizzlies.

Career statistics

Regular season and playoffs

International

Awards and honours

References

External links

1983 births
Fehérvár AV19 players
Canadian people of Croatian descent
Bridgeport Sound Tigers players
Croatian ice hockey left wingers
Dornbirn Bulldogs players
EC Red Bull Salzburg players
Graz 99ers players
Hamilton Bulldogs (AHL) players
Ice hockey people from Alberta
KHL Medveščak Zagreb players
Lake Erie Monsters players
Living people
Manchester Monarchs (AHL) players
Medicine Hat Tigers players
Reading Royals players
Sportspeople from St. Albert, Alberta
Tri-City Americans players
Utah Grizzlies (ECHL) players